Ralph Boulton (22 July 1923 – 1992) was an English professional footballer who played as an inside forward.

References

1923 births
1992 deaths
Footballers from Grimsby
English footballers
Association football inside forwards
Grimsby Town F.C. players
Goole Town F.C. players
English Football League players